Maria Yaroslavna of Borovsk (Мария Ярославна in Russian) (1418–1484) was a Grand Princess consort of Muscovy; she was married to Grand Prince Vasily II of Moscow.   She was the daughter of Yaroslav Vladimirovich, Prince of Maloyaroslavets, and Maria, granddaughter of Fyodor Koshka.

Biography 
Maria Yaroslavna became the Grand Princess in 1433 after her marriage to Vasily II of Moscow. Two years later the sons of Yury of Zvenigorod, Vasily Kosoy and Dmitry Shemyaka, usurped the throne and she was exiled to Galich. With great difficulty, she managed to return to Moscow.

On February 12, 1446, Dmitry Shemyaka with Ioann of Mozhaysk and Boris of Tver attacked Moscow. Maria Yaroslavna was captured and put into prison. On February 16, 1446, she was sent into exile to Uglich, together with her husband.

In later years, together with her mother-in-law Sophia of Lithuania, Maria played a significant role in the principality. In order to ingratiate herself with the church, in 1450 she exempt the Trinity Lavra of St. Sergius from taxes, and the Kirillo-Belozersky Monastery in 1471.

After her husband's death she inherited Rostov and Poshekhonye, and some other lands. In 1480 she blessed her son Ivan III of Russia to fight against Khan Ahmed. The fasti mention her as a wise, reasonable woman, and that even as adults, her children sought her advice.

Maria Yaroslavna took the veil under name Marfa in 1482, died in 1484. At first, she was buried in Starodevichy Convent of the Moscow Kremlin. In 1929 her remains were moved to the Cathedral of the Archangel.

Children 
Maria Yaroslavna had 10 children:
Yury Bolshoy (lit. 'Yury the Big') (1437—1441);
Ivan III, the Grand Prince of Moscow in 1462-1505;
Yury Vasilyevich of Dmitrov (1462 — 1473), prince of Dmitrov, Mozhaysk, and Serpukhov;
Andrey Bolshoy (lit. 'Andrew the Big') (1446—1493), prince of Uglich, Zvenigorod, and Mozhaysk;
Simeon (1447—1449);
Boris (1449—1494), prince of Volotzk and Ruza;
Anna (died before 1501);
Andrew Menshoy (lit. 'Andrew the Young'), prince of Vologda;
Dmitry (1455 — before 1461);
Mariya (died in 1465).

References

|-

|-

|-

1418 births
1484 deaths
Russian royal consorts
15th-century Russian women
15th-century Russian people